8-oxoguanine deaminase (8-OGD) is an enzyme with systematic name 8-oxoguanine aminohydrolase. This enzyme catalyses the following chemical reaction

 8-oxoguanine + H2O  urate + NH3

Zn2+ is bound in the active site.

References

External links 
 

EC 3.5.4